Club Deportivo Don Benito is a Spanish football team based in Don Benito, in the autonomous community of Extremadura. Founded in 1928 it plays in Segunda División RFEF – Group 4, holding home matches at Estadio Vicente Sanz, with a capacity of 5,000 seats.

History 
The club was founded on August 19, 1928. In the Modern Hall (now Imperial Theater), 150 young people gathered to agree upon the board of directors of the football society. Vicente Sanz Diéguez was appointed a president.

Season to season

6 seasons in Segunda División B
1 season in Segunda División RFEF
52 seasons in Tercera División

Honours
Tercera División: 1954–55, 1955–56, 1987–88, 1990–91, 1994–95, 2003–04, 2007–08, 2017–18

Current squad

Famous players
 Albert Stroni
 Juanma

References

External links
Official website 
Futbolme team profile 
Club & stadium history  Estadios de España 

Football clubs in Extremadura
Association football clubs established in 1928
1928 establishments in Spain
Province of Badajoz